There have been no Gaelic queens of all Ireland since the late 12th century, following the complex sequence of the Norman invasion of Ireland, Treaty of Windsor (1175), and death of the last true High King of Ireland, Rory O'Connor, in 1198. However there were many provincial Gaelic queens in subsequent centuries until the final Tudor conquest in 1603. Between 1171 and 1541 the kings of England claimed the title lord of Ireland. The Crown of Ireland Act 1542 declared Henry VIII of England and his successors to be kings of Ireland. For a list of their consorts, see list of English royal consorts and list of British consorts.

Queens of Ireland

Semi-historical Queens

Historical Queens

Notes

Sources
Ireland, Foundation for Medieval Genealogy

 
consort
Ireland, Queen of
Ireland, Queen of